Personal Cipher (in Persian: صفر شخصی) is the 8th official studio album by Iranian singer-songwriter Mohsen Namjoo. It was released on 6 June 2016.

Track listing
Maryam 5:16
Agar Bezari 3:54
Ara 7:08
Mojir 6:02
Morassa Khani 10:46
Che Kasi 7:10
Be Madaram 3:31
Pedar 4:50
Shane Hayam 5:15
Che Khabar 5:24

References

2014 albums
Mohsen Namjoo albums